The papal conclave of May 1605 was convened on the death of Pope Leo XI and ended with the election of Camillo Borghese as Pope Paul V on 16 May 1605. It was the second of two papal conclaves in 1605, with Leo dying on 27 April 1605, twenty-six days after he was elected in the March–April 1605 papal conclave.

Pope Nicholas II had reserved the right to elect the pope to the cardinal bishops, priests, and deacons of Rome in 1059. The cardinal bishops were the highest rank, being the bishops of the ancient suburbicarian dioceses. Cardinal priests ranked next, serving as the titular head of historically important churches in Rome. Last ranked the cardinal deacons, who were nominally assigned one of the ancient diaconia where traditionally deacons had administered the material possessions of the Church of Rome. Cardinals were required to have been ordained at least to the rank of their order within the College of Cardinals, but could also be ordained to a higher order.

In 1586, Pope Sixtus V had mandated that the maximum number of cardinals be seventy. Of these, the College of Cardinals had sixty-nine total members at the time of Clement VIII's death. Following Leo's election, Girolamo Agucchi had also died on 27 April, the same day as Leo, reducing the total number of cardinals in the College by two. The electors present had been created by six different popes: Pius IV, Gregory XIII, Sixtus V, Gregory XIV, Innocent IX, and Clement VIII. Clement's creations were the most numerous, as he had created thirty-nine of the cardinal electors. Innocent IX had created one of the conclave's electors, Gregory XIV had created five, Sixtus V had created eleven, Gregory XIII had created three, and Pius IV had created one.

Cardinal electors
Fifty-nine total cardinals entered the conclave, and Paolo Emilio Zacchia and Carlo Gaudenzio Madruzzo participated in the conclave, assenting to the final vote, but did not enter the proceedings because they were sick.

Notes

Citations

References

1605 in the Papal States
17th-century elections in Europe
1605 in politics
1605 05
17th-century Catholicism